Colombia competed at the 2008 Summer Olympics. The country sent 68 athletes to compete in 15 sports (archery, athletics, boxing, rowing, cycling, equestrian, artistic gymnastics, judo, weightlifting, wrestling, swimming, taekwondo, and table tennis), making this Colombia's largest ever delegation to the Olympics.

Originally, Colombia left Beijing with two medals, a silver and a bronze won by weightlifter Diego Salazar and wrestler Jackeline Rentería respectively. Weightlifter Leidy Solis originally finished fourth, but was promoted to a silver medal after both gold and bronze medalist of the 69 kg category were disqualified following a positive anti-doping test of their respective 2008 samples. She received her medal in december 2017.

Medalists

Archery

Colombia sent archers to the Olympics for the third time and first since 1992; the nation sought its first Olympic medal in the sport. Colombia qualified a full team of three women by placing ninth in the women's team event at the 2007 World Outdoor Target Championships (because host China took seventh, nine teams were taken instead of the usual eight). The team that Colombia sent to the Olympics was the same that competed at the Worlds: Sigrid Romero, Ana Rendón, and Natalia Sánchez.

Athletics

Men
Track & road events

Women
Track & road events

Field events

Boxing

Colombia qualified five boxers for the Olympic boxing tournament. Romero and Pérez qualified at the world championships. Álvarez, Julio Blanco, and Rivas qualified at the second American continental qualifying tournament.

Cycling

Road

Track
Pursuit

Omnium

Mountain biking

BMX

Diving 

Men

Women

Equestrian

Show jumping

Gymnastics

Artistic
Men

Women

Judo

Rowing 

Men

Qualification Legend: FA=Final A (medal); FB=Final B (non-medal); FC=Final C (non-medal); FD=Final D (non-medal); FE=Final E (non-medal); FF=Final F (non-medal); SA/B=Semifinals A/B; SC/D=Semifinals C/D; SE/F=Semifinals E/F; QF=Quarterfinals; R=Repechage

Sailing 

Men

M = Medal race; EL = Eliminated – did not advance into the medal race; CAN = Race cancelled

Shooting 

Men

Swimming

Men

Women

Table tennis

Taekwondo

Weightlifting 

Men

Women

Wrestling 

Men's freestyle

Women's freestyle

See also
 Colombia at the 2007 Pan American Games
 Colombia at the 2008 Summer Paralympics
 Colombia at the 2010 Central American and Caribbean Games

References

Nations at the 2008 Summer Olympics
2008
Olympics